Thomas C. Egan (July 15, 1894 – July 6, 1961) was a United States district judge of the United States District Court for the Eastern District of Pennsylvania.

Education and career

Born in Shenandoah, Pennsylvania, Egan received an Artium Baccalaureus degree from Georgetown University in 1917 and entered private practice in Philadelphia.

Federal judicial service

On August 7, 1957, Egan was nominated by President Dwight D. Eisenhower to a seat on the United States District Court for the Eastern District of Pennsylvania vacated by Judge George Austin Welsh. Egan was confirmed by the United States Senate on August 22, 1957, and received his commission on August 26, 1957. He served in that capacity until his death on July 6, 1961.

References

Sources
 

1894 births
1961 deaths
Judges of the United States District Court for the Eastern District of Pennsylvania
United States district court judges appointed by Dwight D. Eisenhower
20th-century American judges
People from Shenandoah, Pennsylvania